24 Hours in A&E is a British documentary programme, set in a teaching hospital in inner London. Initially it was filmed in King's College Hospital in Denmark Hill, Camberwell, but in the seventh series, the setting was changed to St George's Hospital in Tooting, Wandsworth. For season 30 the setting changed again, this time moving out of London to Queens Medical Centre in Nottingham. Cameras film round the clock for 28 days, 24 hours a day in A&E (Accident and Emergency). It offers unprecedented access to one of Britain's busiest A&E departments.

Overview
24 Hours in A&E gives viewers behind the scenes access to King's College Hospital in Camberwell and St George's Hospital Accident & Emergency Department, in Tooting, SW London. In season 30, the series relocated to Queens Medical Center in Nottingham. Series one aired every Wednesday at 21:00 and consisted of 14 one-hour episodes. The filming took place over 28 days using 70 fixed cameras and is the largest documentary series Channel 4 has ever made.

The series enables viewers to see the challenges that A&E staff face as they treat the patients that come through the doors every day.

The episodes show how the staff work as a team to treat those patients present involved in a full range of minor and serious conditions, both medical (suspected heart attack, aortic abdominal aneurysm, stroke) and trauma (from household accidents to road traffic collisions). The fly-on-the-wall footage is intercut with subsequent interviews with staff, patients and relatives giving their perspectives and background on the events shown.

Filming for the second series ended in March 2012. It began broadcasting on 16 May 2012, again appearing in the Wednesday 21:00 slot. The seventh series was filmed in St George's Hospital, Tooting. The first episode of this series was broadcast on 29 October 2014 at 21:00.

Episodes

Series overview

Series 1 (2011)

Series 2 (2012)

Series 3 (2013)

Series 4 (2013)

Series 5 (2014)

Series 6 (2014)

Series 7 (2014) 
Series 7 started on 29 October 2014 with a new cast and new hospital. The new series was set at St Georges Hospital in Tooting London.

Series 8 (2015)

Series 9 (2015)

Series 10 (2015-16)

Series 11 (2016)

Series 12 (2016-17)

Series 13 (2017)

Series 14 (2018)

Series 15 (2018)

Series 16 (2018)

Series 17 (2019)

Series 18 (2019)

Series 19 (2019)

Series 20 (2020)

Series 21 (2020)

Series 22 (2020)

Series 23 (2021)

Series 24 (2021)

Series 25 (2021)

Series 26 (2022)

Series 27 (2022)

Series 28 (2022)

Specials

Related shows
The production company behind the series (The Garden Productions) have also made a four-part observational documentary series about mental health. Two years in the making, Bedlam was filmed within clinical services provided by South London and Maudsley NHS Foundation Trust (SLaM). Both SLaM and King's College Hospital are part of King's Health Partners Academic Health Sciences Centre.

Keeping Britain Alive: The NHS in a Day, also made by The Garden Productions, but for BBC Two, was based on the inverse premise to 24 Hours in A&E: instead of observing different days in a single institution, the eight-part series followed the work of a variety of NHS services on a single day, Thursday 18 October 2012. The series aired from March 2013.

Due to the success of 24 Hours in A&E, Channel 4 commissioned a series with the same format that follows police officers in Luton, called 24 Hours in Police Custody.

Awards and nominations

References

External links

2010s British documentary television series
2020s British documentary television series
2011 British television series debuts
2010s British medical television series
2020s British medical television series
Channel 4 documentaries
Television series by ITV Studios
English-language television shows